Alejandro 'Álex' Cruz Hernández (born 31 October 1986) is a Spanish footballer who plays as a left-back.

Club career
Born in El Puerto de Santa María, Province of Cádiz, Cruz finished his youth career with local Cádiz CF, and made his senior debut with the reserves in the 2005–06 season. In 2007 he first arrived in Segunda División B, joining Racing Club Portuense.

In August 2008, Cruz signed with Segunda División club Gimnàstic de Tarragona. He played his first professional match on 6 December, featuring the full 90 minutes in a 1–1 away draw against Deportivo Alavés. In January of the following year, he was loaned to CD Atlético Baleares in division three.

Cruz remained in the third tier the following years, with CF Atlético Ciudad, Lucena CF, Real Jaén and Real Avilés CF. On 9 July 2013 he returned to Jaén, recently promoted to the second league.

References

External links

1986 births
Living people
People from El Puerto de Santa María
Sportspeople from the Province of Cádiz
Spanish footballers
Footballers from Andalusia
Association football defenders
Segunda División players
Segunda División B players
Tercera División players
Segunda Federación players
Cádiz CF B players
Racing Club Portuense players
Gimnàstic de Tarragona footballers
CD Atlético Baleares footballers
CF Atlético Ciudad players
Lucena CF players
Real Jaén footballers
Real Avilés CF footballers
CD Toledo players
UE Costa Brava players
UD Melilla footballers
Atlético Sanluqueño CF players
Xerez Deportivo FC footballers